Amora Futebol Clube, commonly known as simply as Amora, is a Portuguese sports club from the city of Amora, Setúbal. The club was founded on the 1 May 1921 and its founders were Mário de Carvalho, Guilherme Pestana, João Baptista, Julião Garcia, Tomás Alves, António Soares, Joaquim Monteiro, Oswaldo Reuter, Guilherme Reuter, Joaquim Zacarias, Leopoldo Grilo, Carlos de Azeitão, António Policia, Álvaro dos Santos, Jacinto Caixeiro, Alberto Malacato, Tomás da Cachamouca and António Manta. It currently plays at the Estádio da Medideira which also plays host to the club's reserve and youth teams.

The club currently plays in the Liga 3. The club has played on three occasions in the Primeira Liga from 1980–81 season until the 1982–83 season. José Mourinho's father Félix led the club to the Primeira Liga for the first time in 1980.

Appearances

Premier Division: 3
Tier 2: 2
Tier 3: 23
Tier 4: 27

Honours

Segunda Divisão
 Winners (2): 1979–80, 1993–94
Terceira Divisão
 Winners (1): 2000–01

AF Setúbal First Division
 Winners (4): 1953–54, 1961–62, 1962–63, 1968–69
AF Setúbal Cup
 Winners (1): 2011–12

League and cup history

Presidents

Current squad

Notable former players
  Cafú
  Carlitos
  Leonildo Soares

References

External links
 Official Site
 Web Archive of official site
 Profile at ForaDeJogo
 Profile at ZeroZero

Football clubs in Portugal
Association football clubs established in 1921
1921 establishments in Portugal
Primeira Liga clubs
Liga Portugal 2 clubs
Seixal
Sport in Setúbal District